Swanfels is a rural locality in the Southern Downs Region, Queensland, Australia. In the  Swanfels had a population of 132 people.

History 
Swanfels Provisional School opened on 18 January 1892. In 1894 it became Swanfels State School. It closed on 12 December 1980.

In the  Swanfels had a population of 132 people.

References 

Southern Downs Region
Localities in Queensland